Miles James Mastrobuoni (born October 31, 1995) is an American professional baseball outfielder and infielder for the Chicago Cubs of Major League Baseball (MLB). He made his MLB debut in 2022 with the Tampa Bay Rays.

Career
Mastrobuoni attended Granada High School in Livermore, California, and the College of San Mateo, where he played college baseball for two years. He transferred to the University of Nevada, Reno to play college baseball for the Nevada Wolf Pack.

The Tampa Bay Rays selected Mastrobuoni in the 14th round of the 2016 MLB draft. He was called up to the majors for the first time on September 22, 2022.

On November 15, 2022, the Rays traded Mastrobuoni to the Chicago Cubs for pitcher Alfredo Zarraga.

References

External links

1995 births
Living people
People from San Ramon, California
Baseball players from California
Major League Baseball outfielders
Major League Baseball infielders
Tampa Bay Rays players
San Mateo Bulldogs baseball players
Nevada Wolf Pack baseball players
Rochester Honkers players
Hudson Valley Renegades players
Bowling Green Hot Rods players
Charlotte Stone Crabs players
Montgomery Biscuits players
Durham Bulls players
American expatriate baseball players in the Dominican Republic
Tigres del Licey players
2023 World Baseball Classic players